Prince Carl Philip of Sweden, Duke of Värmland (Carl Philip Edmund Bertil; born 13 May 1979) is the only son and the second of three children of King Carl XVI Gustaf and Queen Silvia. , Prince Carl Philip is fourth in the line of succession, after his older sister, Crown Princess Victoria, his niece and goddaughter Princess Estelle, and his nephew Prince Oscar. He lives with his wife, Princess Sofia, and three sons, Prince Alexander, Prince Gabriel and Prince Julian in Villa Solbacken in Djurgården, Stockholm.

Early life and education 
Prince Carl Philip was born on 13 May 1979 at Stockholm Palace, Sweden. He was baptised at the Royal Chapel on 31 August 1979. His mother is of half German and half Brazilian descent.

Carl Philip was heir apparent to the throne of Sweden (and thus held the title Crown Prince) for seven months, until 1 January 1980 when a change in the constitution came into effect which made natural birth order the basis for succession to the throne, replacing the principle of agnatic primogeniture. His elder sister Victoria became heir apparent and Crown Princess, with Carl Philip becoming second in line.

During 1984–1986, Prince Carl Philip attended the Västerled parish preschool. In the autumn of 1986, he started school at Smedslättsskolan in Bromma which he attended at junior level. For the intermediate level, he attended Ålstensskolan in Bromma, proceeding from there, in the autumn of 1992, to senior level at Enskilda Gymnasiet in Stockholm. In the autumn of 1994, Carl Philip enrolled at Kent School. He then continued his studies in a science programme at Lundsbergs upper secondary school. He graduated in the spring of 1999. In 2007–2008, he studied graphic design at the Rhode Island School of Design for one year. In 2011, Prince Carl Philip finished his studies in Agricultural and Rural Management at the Swedish University of Agricultural Sciences in Alnarp.

Carl Philip has dyslexia, as do his father King Carl XVI Gustaf and his sister Crown Princess Victoria.

Interests

Prince Carl Philip has been a scout and is fond of outdoor life. He is keen on sport and athletics, especially football, swimming, sailing and skiing. In 2003, he completed the historic Swedish "Vasaloppet", the longest cross country ski race in the world. Carl Philip also enjoys car racing, a passion he inherited from his great-uncle and godfather, Prince Bertil, and has a licence to compete. Prince Carl Philip has taken part in the racing series Porsche Carrera Cup Scandinavia in a Porsche 911 GT3. Since 2013 he has raced in the Scandinavian Touring Car Championship.

The prince completed his military service at the Amphibious Battalion at Vaxholm Coastal Artillery Regiment as a combat boat commander (Combat Boat 90) in the autumn of 2000. In December 2002, the Prince was promoted to second lieutenant, and in 2004 to the rank of lieutenant in the Swedish Amphibious Corps. In 2007 and 2008 he went to the Swedish National Defense College. The course was divided in three weeks autumn 2007 and three weeks spring 2008. After that course he was appointed captain. On 1 October 2014, Prince Carl Philip achieved the rank of major.

With a great interest for design and drawing, the prince began studying graphic design in Stockholm in 2003, studies which he continues still.

Activities and charity work 
Prince Carl Philip and Princess Sofia's Foundation was established to mark the occasion of the couple's marriage in 2015. The foundation's purpose is to counteract bullying.

In 2013, the Prince Carl Philip Racing Cup was founded. The racing cup aims to help young people with karting talents progress within the sport. The Prince with the Royal Swedish Academy of Engineering Sciences conducts a range of visits to companies, with focus on the companies' creative work.

Prince Carl Philip is a patron of several organizations such as The Swedish National Dyslexia Association, The Swedish Rural Economy and Agricultural Societies, The International Union for Conservation of Nature, The Royal Swedish Motorboat Club and others.

Personal life and family

Prince Carl Philip dated Emma Pernald from 1999 to 2009. Pernald worked at a PR firm for several years. However, the prince and Pernald broke off their relationship in March 2009. She revealed in the Swedish newspaper Expressen that she and the prince mutually decided to go their separate ways. Pernald made no further comment as to the reason for the break-up.

In April 2010, Carl Philip was linked in the press with former glamour model Sofia Hellqvist. In August 2010, Royal Court spokesperson Nina Eldh confirmed the relationship between Carl Philip and Hellqvist in a statement released by the palace. On 27 June 2014, it was announced that Carl Philip and Hellqvist were engaged. 

They married on 13 June 2015 in Stockholm's Royal Palace chapel, and thousands of people lined the streets for the occasion. In an interview he criticized the press for suggesting that Hellqvist was not welcome in the royal family. He told the press that the opposite was true and that his family easily accepted her into the family. He compared the "bullying" of her past to that of himself being bullied for having dyslexia.

The couple was due to move into the Villa Solbacken which had been vacant since the death of Princess Lilian, and while it was being renovated, they lived in Rosendal Palace until 2017. 

The couple has three sons:
 On 19 April 2016, Princess Sofia gave birth to a son, Prince Alexander Erik Hubertus Bertil, Duke of Södermanland, at Danderyd Hospital. He was baptised by Archbishop Antje Jackelén in the Palace Chapel at Drottningholm Palace on 9 September 2016.  
 Their second child, Prince Gabriel Carl Walter, Duke of Dalarna, was born on 31 August 2017 at Danderyd Hospital. He was baptised by Archbishop Emeritus Anders Wejryd at Drottningholm on 1 December 2017. 
 Their third son, Prince Julian Herbert Folke, Duke of Halland, was born on 26 March 2021 at Danderyd Hospital. His christening took place on 14 August 2021 in the Drottningholm Palace Chapel.

On 7 October 2019, Carl Philip's father, the king, issued a statement rescinding the royal status of Prince Alexander and Prince Gabriel in an effort to more strictly associate Swedish royalty to the office of the head of state; they are still to be styled as princes and dukes of their provinces, and they remain in the line of succession to the throne. Carl Philip and his wife commented that their sons now will have more freedom of choice for their future lives.

Honours

National honours

 Knight of the Royal Order of the Seraphim (RoKavKMO)
 Commander of the Royal Order of the Polar Star (KNO)
 Knight of the Royal Order of Charles XIII (RCXIII:sO, not worn as Prince Carl Philip is not a Freemason)
 Recipient of the King Carl XVI Gustaf's Jubilee Commemorative Medal I (30 April 1996)
 Recipient of the Crown Princess Victoria and Prince Daniel's Wedding Commemorative Medal (8 June 2010)
 Recipient of the King Carl XVI Gustaf's Jubilee Commemorative Medal II (23 August 2013)
 Recipient of the King Carl XVI Gustaf's Jubilee Commemorative Medal III (30 April 2016)
 Recipient of the 
 Recipient of the Swedish Armed Forces Conscript Medal
 Recipient of the Swedish National Defence College Commemorative Medal (Försvarshögskolans minnesmedalj)
 Recipient of the  Medal of Merit in gold (Fredsbaskrarna Sveriges förtjänstmedalj i guld) (22 January 2013)

Foreign honours

 Bulgaria: 1st Class of the Order of the Balkan Mountains
 Brazil: Grand Cross of the Order of Rio Branco
 Chile: Grand Cross of the Order of Merit
 Estonia: Member 1st Class of the Order of the Cross of Terra Mariana
 Finland: Grand Cross of the Order of the White Rose
 Germany: Grand Cross 1st Class of the Order of Merit of the Federal Republic of Germany
 Greece: Grand Cross of the Order of Honour
 Iceland: Grand Cross of the Order of the Falcon
 Italy: 1st Class / Knight Grand Cross of the Order of Merit of the Italian Republic (2 November 2018)
 Jordan: Grand Cordon of the Order of the Star of Jordan
 Latvia: Grand Officer of the Order of the Three Stars
 Luxembourg: Grand Cross of the Order of Adolphe of Nassau
 Malaysia:
 Honorary Commander of the Order of Loyalty to the Crown of Malaysia (2005)
 Netherlands:
 Grand Cross of the Order of the Crown (11 October 2022)
 Norway: Grand Cross of the Order of St. Olav (1 September 2005)
 Spain: Knight Grand Cross of the Order of Civil Merit (16 November 2021)
 Romania: Grand Cross of the Order of Faithful Service
 Tunisia: Grand Officer of the Order of Merit

Military ranks
 December 2002: Second Lieutenant
 14 December 2004: Lieutenant
 December 2007: Captain
 1 October 2014: Major

Arms

Prince Carl Philip's coat of arms is based on the greater coat of arms of Sweden. It features in the first and fourth quarters, the Three Crowns; in the second, the lion of the House of Bjelbo; and in the third, the eagle of the arms of Värmland, representing the titular designation of his dukedom. In the centre, on an inescutcheon, is the dynastic arms of the House of Bernadotte. Surrounding the shield is the chain of the Order of the Seraphim.

Ancestry

References

External links

The Royal Court of Sweden: Prince Carl Philip
Bernadotte and Galliera princely inheritance (in Swedish)

|-

1979 births
Living people
Varmland
Heirs apparent who never acceded
House of Bernadotte
Kent School alumni
Rhode Island School of Design alumni
Swedish Lutherans
Swedish people of Brazilian descent
Swedish people of German descent
Carl Philip 1979
Crown Princes of Sweden
People educated at Enskilda Gymnasiet
People from Stockholm

Knights of the Order of Charles XIII
Grand Crosses of the National Order of Faithful Service
Grand Crosses of the Order of Honour (Greece)
Grand Crosses 1st class of the Order of Merit of the Federal Republic of Germany
Recipients of the Order of the Cross of Terra Mariana, 1st Class
Honorary Commanders of the Order of Loyalty to the Crown of Malaysia
Knights Grand Cross of the Order of the Falcon
Order of Civil Merit members
Royalty and nobility with dyslexia
Sons of kings
Swedish racing drivers
Grand Crosses of the Order of the Crown (Netherlands)